Taman Bahagia LRT station is a 2-storey LRT train station with a car park in Petaling Jaya, Malaysia that is served by rapidKL's Kelana Jaya Line. The station was constructed between 1995 and 1998 on a piece of land that was previously occupied by the Taman Gelora row of 25 single-storey terraced houses. The owners and residences started to move out of their homes in June 1995. The adjacent Taman Gelora 11 kV Tenaga Nasional substation is the sole reminder of the previous existence of these homes.

This station serves the neighbourhoods of SS2, SS3, SS4 and SS23. Buses from this station also extend the reach of this station to sections SS 4, SS5 & SS6 in Kelana Jaya, Damansara Jaya (SS22) & Damansara Utama (SS21).

The station is located along Jalan SS 2/3, near the Taman Megah interchange of the Damansara–Puchong Expressway or better known as the LDP.

Parking is available behind the station although it is a free car park and there is no security.

See also

 List of rail transit stations in Klang Valley

External links 
Taman Bahagia LRT Station - mrt.com.my

Kelana Jaya Line
Railway stations opened in 1998